Ole Rasmussen may refer to:
Ole Rasmussen (footballer, born 1952), Danish footballer who played 41 Danish national team games
Ole Rasmussen (footballer, born 1960), Danish footballer who played two Danish national team games
Ole Riber Rasmussen, Danish sports shooter